Singapore competed in the 2017 Summer Deaflympics which was held in Samsun, Turkey after narrowly missing the opportunity to compete at the 2013 Summer Deaflympics. Singapore sent a delegation consisting of 5 participants for the event. This was only the fourth time that Singapore was eligible participate at the Summer Deaflympics after making its Deaflympic debut in 2001.

Medalists

Medal table

References

External links 
 Singapore at the Deaflympics

Nations at the 2017 Summer Deaflympics
2017 in Singaporean sport